Elishama Tozer (July 3, 1741 – 1833) was an American politician from New York.

Life
He was born on July 3, 1741, in Lyme, New Hampshire, the son of Thomas Tozer (born 1711) and Deborah (Bates) Tozer (born 1718). In 1761, he married Mary, and they had several children. They lived in Whitehall, New York.

During the American Revolutionary War, he was a lieutenant in the Green Mountain Boys under Maj. John Brown.

He was a member from Charlotte County of the New York State Assembly in 1778-79 and a member of the New York State Senate (Eastern D.) in 1779-80.

About 1801 he moved to Waverly, Tioga County, New York.

He died in 1833, and was buried at the Rest Cemetery in Sayre, Pennsylvania.

Sources
Ancestors of Stephen Gregg Parker at Family Tree Maker
Tri-Counties Genealogy & History by Joyce M. Tice
The New York Civil List compiled by Franklin Benjamin Hough (pages 111 and 158; Weed, Parsons and Co., 1858) [name given as "Elishamer Towser" on page 158, and "Elishamer Towzer" on page 310]

External links

1741 births
1833 deaths
People from Lyme, New Hampshire
Members of the New York State Assembly
New York (state) state senators
People from Whitehall, New York
People from Waverly, Tioga County, New York